Auzata is a genus of moths belonging to the subfamily Drepaninae. It was erected by Walker in 1863.

Species
Auzata amaryssa H.F. Chu & L.Y. Wang, 1988
Auzata chinensis Leech, 1898
Auzata minuta Leech, 1898
Auzata ocellata (Warren, 1896)
Auzata plana H.F. Chu & L.Y. Wang, 1988
Auzata semilucida H.F. Chu & L.Y. Wang, 1988
Auzata semipavonaria Walker, [1863]
Auzata simpliciata Warren, 1897
Auzata superba Butler, 1878

References

  (1988). "On the Chinese Drepaninae (Lepidoptera: Drepanidae) genera Auzata Walker, 1862 and Macrocilix Butler, 1886". Acta Entomologica Sinica. 31 (4): 414–422.
  (1959). "A revision of the genus Auzata Walker (Lepidoptera, Drepanidae)". Bonner Zoologische Beiträge. 9: 232–258.

Drepaninae
Drepanidae genera